David Miles Huber is an American composer and producer in the downtempo, ambient and dance genres. He is also the author of numerous books on recording and electronic music. Huber's CD series Relaxation and Meditation with Music and Nature has sold over one million copies. His latest music and collaborations are available through the 51bpm independent record label. Huber's most prominent book, Modern Recording Techniques, has sold over 250,000 copies and become a standard recording industry text.

Huber received his degree in music technology from Indiana University (I.M.P.), and was the first American to be admitted into the Tonmeister program at the University of Surrey in Guildford, Surrey, England.

Selected discography
Colabs (2008), 51bm.com llc - 51bpm-005CD (stereo CD) - one CD 
Colabs (2008), 51bm.com llc - 51bpm-008dtsCD (surround dts CD) - one surround dts CD 
Relaxation and Meditation with Music and Nature (1993), Delta Music - two 5-CD sets 
Between the Sea & the Sky (1996), Delta Music - 5-CD box set 
Roads (1979), 51bpm.com llc - 51bpm-001DL (stereo download) 
Chamberland (2012), 51bm.com llc Nominated for Best Surround Sound Album (55th Annual Grammy Awards Winner 2013)

Selected bibliography
Audio Production Techniques for Video. H.W. Sams, 1987. 
Microphone Manual: Design and Application. H.W. Sams, 1988. 
Random Access Audio. SAMS Pub., 1992. 
Hard Disk Recording for Musicians. Music Sales Corp, 1995. 
Professional Microphone Techniques (with Philip Williams). Thomson Course Technology, 1998. 
Modern Recording Techniques (with Robert E. Runstein). Seventh edition, Elsevier, 2010. 
The MIDI Manual: A Practical Guide to MIDI in the Project Studio. Third edition, Elsevier, 2007.

References

External links
The Official site of David Miles Huber
The Official Modern Recording Techniques website, companion site to the book
51bpm.com label website

American DJs
Living people
American record producers
American information and reference writers
Electroacoustic music composers
Year of birth missing (living people)
Indiana University alumni